Pocket Planes is a business simulation video game developed by NimbleBit for iOS. It was initially released on 14 June 2012. In October 2012, the game became available on the Mac App Store. An Android version, ported and published by Mobage, was released on 22 September 2012. The game was removed on 24 September 2015 from the Google Play Store, however was re-released 17 March 2022. The game is still available on iOS App Store in selected regions (U.S., Canada, Australia). An update to the iOS version is also planned and will see the game available again in all countries.

Gameplay

In Pocket Planes, players assume the role of an airline CEO. Starting with a few airports and small planes, players transport small amounts of cargo and passengers short distances. As they slowly gain profit from their flights, they then build more airports, buy better planes, and expand their airline internationally.

A formula determines how much profit will be earned from a flight, depending on the distance, speed and the weight of the plane used on the route. Filling a plane with cargo or passengers going to the same destination will net a 25% bonus on each item. Players can also complete events that involve flying special items and people to a designated destination. After completing these events, players are awarded Bux, which are used to buy planes and purchase other perks such as upgrades and the ability to speed up flights.

Android version
On 24 September 2015, the company that ported the game to Android, Mobage, shut down their game servers for Pocket Planes and other NimbleBit games including Pocket Frogs and Tiny Tower, and subsequently removed these downloads from the Google Play Store.

The other games have since been relaunched on the Google Play Store by NimbleBit themselves, and on April 19, 2021, it was announced that a new Android port of Pocket Planes was in development.

On March 17, 2022, NimbleBit re-released Pocket Planes to the Google Play Store.

Reception

The game was viewed favorably by reviewers. It holds a 78/100 score on the aggregate Metacritic, categorizing it as "Generally favorable reviews" based on 17 reviewers. Gamezebo.com rated it 4.5 stars out of 5, stating "NimbleBit has once again dropped you in the middle of a universe that feels like it was built just for you, and filled it with a deeper, more compelling mission".

However, Ryan Rigney of Wired wrote that the player's success did not correlate with skill, and criticizes it for a lack of compelling gameplay.

See also
 Pocket Frogs
 Pocket Trains
 Tiny Tower

References

External links
NimbleBit Official Website

2012 video games
Android (operating system) games
Business simulation games
IOS games
NimbleBit games
Single-player video games
Video games developed in the United States